Peter Zec (born 1956) is a German design consultant as well as author and publisher. Furthermore, he is president (2005–2007) of the International Council of Societies of Industrial Design (Icsid), the global organisation that promotes better design around the world, and initiator of the Red Dot Design Award. In October 2006, the German business magazine “Wirtschaftswoche” elected him one of the “20 creative unconventional thinkers changing the appearance of their companies and creating completely new markets”.

Life
Peter Zec studied Media Studies, Psychology, and Art Theory. From 1986 to 1988 he was head of the specialist field “image” and as such was highly involved in the planning of the Centre of Arts and Media Technologies (ZKM), which had been established in Karlsruhe. Peter Zec was president of the Federation of German Graphic Designers (BDG) and the Association of German Industrial Designers (VDID). Since 1991, he has been the head of the Design Zentrum Nordrhein Westfalen. During these years he has published books and compendia about the subject of design and he has accepted invitations to lecture all over the world.

From 1993 to 2010 he was a professor for economic communication at the University of Applied Science for Technology and Economics in Berlin. Since May 2001, he is managing partner of the Red Dot GmbH & Co. KG. Zec is of the opinion that design may contribute to a significant appreciation and greater success on the international market if it is included as a relevant basis into corporate strategy. After the Red Dot Design Award has established as one of the biggest design awards in the past years also in the Asian countries Zec together with Ken Koo, present manager of red dot Singapore, succeeds to call into being the Red Dot Award: Design Concept.

From September 2005 to October 2007, Zec was president of the international umbrella organisation of design ICSID (International Council of Societies of Industrial Design) and from October 2006 to October 2007 chairman of the International Design Alliance IDA, thus holding the highest official posts in the design world. As a former Icsid president, he now holds the rank of “Icsid Senator” and is consulted on all important issues concerning the association. He initiated the programme "World Design Capital".

In 2016, he was honoured as "Kopf des Jahres" (Brain of the Year) by the Marketing Club Ruhr for his services to the German region.
 Moreover, in the same year, he was awarded honorary citizenship of the City of Seoul because of his commitment to the South Korean capital.

Works
Zec is editor of the Red Dot Design Yearbook and the International Yearbook Communication Design. He has published the following books among others:

1988 - Informationsdesign
1996 - Design goes virtual!
1997 - German Design Standards
1999 - Designing Success
2000 - Good Design
2002 - Orientierung im Raum
2003 - Hall of Fame. Companies Searching for Excellence in Design
2004 - Who’s Who in Design
2006 - Return on Ideas - Better by Design
2010 - Design Value
2015 - Dauernde, nicht endgültige Form
2015 - Every Product Tells a Story
2017 - Homo Ex Data: The Natural of the Artificial
2018 - The Form of Success: Design as a Corporate Strategy (Designing Success)
2019 - The Form of Simplicity: Good Design for a Better Quality of Life

External links
Peter Zec's Profile

References

1956 births
Businesspeople from Lower Saxony
German designers
Living people
People from Osnabrück